Pash-e Sofla (also Romanized as Pash-e Soflá; also known as Pā’īn Pash) is a village in Deylaman Rural District, Deylaman District, Siahkal County, Gilan Province, Iran. At the 2006 census, its population was 74, in 17 families.

References 

Populated places in Siahkal County